Haven Lake is a mill pond formed by an antiquated dam across the source of the Mispillion River in the U.S. state of Delaware.  It is located in the city of Milford, where U.S. Route 113 serves as a major highway.  Haven Lake is west of U.S. Route 113. The route crosses the Mispillion River, which defines the boundary between Sussex and Kent Counties. Haven Lake is adjacent to Silver Lake.

References

Bodies of water in Kent County, Delaware
Bodies of water in Sussex County, Delaware
Reservoirs in Delaware
Milford, Delaware